The Siberian Elm cultivar Ulmus pumila 'Mr. Buzz' is a selection made by the Westerveldt Tree Co. of Selma, Alabama.

Description
'Mr. Buzz' was distinguished by its dense crown and dark-green foliage.

Pests and diseases
See under Ulmus pumila.

Cultivation
Reputedly of vigorous growth, the tree had been withdrawn from commerce before 1995. It is not known whether it still survives.

References

Siberian elm cultivar
Ulmus articles missing images
Ulmus